The following is the 1959–60 network television schedule for the three major English language commercial broadcast networks in the United States. The schedule covers primetime hours from September 1959 through March 1960. The schedule is followed by a list per network of returning series, new series, and series cancelled after the 1958–59 season.

By the end of the 1950s, the three major U.S. television networks had basically given up direct control of their TV programs. According to TV historians Castleman and Podrazik (1982), ABC allowed Warner Brothers studios to fill 30% of its fall 1959 schedule. The networks "acted as mere conduits", with Warner, Talent Associates, Revue Studios, Ziv, Screen Gems, 20th Century-Fox, Goodson-Todman, and Desilu Studios producing nearly everything on the networks; with rare exceptions, only network news and sports were still produced in-house.

By fall 1959 what the Hollywood studios were producing were mostly Westerns. According to Castleman and Podrazik (1984), "the rush to Westerns had become a virtual stampede so that, by the fall of 1959, viewers had their choice from a staggering twenty-eight different Western-based prime time series." Westerns were popular with audiences, but critics lamented the loss of other program formats, which had quietly vanished from the three networks' schedules. The addition of Westerns and game shows came at the direct expense of the live dramatic anthology series seen during the Golden Age of Television.

All times are Eastern and Pacific. New fall series are highlighted in bold.

The official schedule was set by each network before the start of the official fall season. The fall season is from September to November in the U.S.. The mid-season schedule is listed under the official fall season lineup of each network. The mid-season schedule is from December 1959 to May 1960.

Each of the 30 highest-rated shows is listed with its rank and rating as determined by Nielsen Media Research.

 Yellow indicates the programs in the top 10 for the season.
 Cyan indicates the programs in the top 20 for the season.
 Magenta indicates the programs in the top 30 for the season.

Sunday 

Notes: The CBS 1960 summer series Lucy in Connecticut consisted of reruns of I Love Lucy from the final 13 episodes of the 1956-57 season when the Lucy and Ricky Ricardo characters made their home in Westport, Connecticut. On ABC, the 1959-60 winter series 21 Beacon Street consisted of reruns of NBC's 1959 summer series.

Monday 

(*) In some areas, Douglas Edwards with the News and The Huntley-Brinkley Report aired at 6:45 p.m.
(**) Formerly known as The Steve Allen Show

New episodes of Richard Diamond, Private Detective, starring David Janssen, during the season were split, with some airing on NBC from October 1959 to January 1960 on Mondays at 7:30 p.m. Eastern Time, and the remainder on NBC on Tuesdays at 9:00 p.m. Eastern from June to September 1960.

Tuesday 

Notes: Gas Company Playhouse and NBC Playhouse alternated weekly. Gas Company Playhouse, hosted by Julia Meade, consisted of reruns of Goodyear Television Playhouse, The David Niven Show, Colgate Theater, and Alcoa Theatre. NBC Playhouse, hosted by Jeanne Bal, consisted of reruns of episodes of The Loretta Young Show in which Loretta Young had not starred.

New episodes of Richard Diamond, Private Detective, starring David Janssen, were split during the 1959–1960 season, with some airing on NBC from October 1959 to January 1960 on Mondays at 7:30 p.m. Eastern Time, and the remainder on NBC on Tuesdays at 9:00 p.m. Eastern from June to September 1960.

Wednesday 

Note: On ABC, Music For a Spring Night was the summer 1959 series Music For a Summer Night renamed. It reverted to the name Music For a Summer Night in May 1960.

Thursday 

Note; The ABC 1960 summer series The Jeannie Carson Show consisted of reruns of the 1956-1957 CBS situation comedy Hey, Jeannie!

Friday

Saturday

By network

ABC

Returning Series
77 Sunset Strip
The Adventures of Ozzie and Harriet
Alcoa Presents: One Step Beyond
Black Saddle
Broken Arrow
Bronco
Cheyenne
Colt .45
Dick Clark's Saturday Night Beach-Nut Show
The Donna Reed Show
The Gale Storm Show
The Jeannie Carson Show
Johnny Staccato (moved from NBC later this season)
Jubilee USA
Keep Talking
Lawman
The Lawrence Welk Show
Leave It to Beaver
The Life and Legend of Wyatt Earp
Man with a Camera
Maverick
Music for a Spring Night
Music for a Summer Night
The Pat Boone Chevy Showroom
The Rifleman
Sugarfoot
Walt Disney Presents
The Wednesday Night Fights

New Series
The Alaskans
Black Saddle *
Bourbon Street Beat
Charley Weaver's Hobby Lobby
The Detectives Starring Robert Taylor
Dick Clark's World of Talent
Hawaiian Eye
John Gunther's High Road
The Man from Blackhawk
Matty's Funday Funnies
Philip Marlowe
Playhouse 90
The Rebel
Take a Good Look
The Twilight Zone
The United States Steel Hour
The Untouchables
Walter Cronkite with the News
 Wanted: Dead or Alive

Not returning from 1958–59:
ABC News
Accused
Anybody Can Play/Anyone Can Play
The Billy Graham Crusade
Bold Journey
Confession
Deadline for Action
Dr. I.Q.
Encounter
John Daly and the News
Lawrence Welk's Dodge Dancing Party
Lawrence Welk's Plymouth Show
The Patti Page Oldsmobile Show
Polka Go-Round
Rough Riders
Sammy Kaye's Music from Manhattan
Tales of the Texas Rangers
This is Music
Traffic Court
The Voice of Firestone
Walt Disney Presents
You Asked For It
Zorro

CBS

Returning Series
Alfred Hitchcock Presents
Armstrong Circle Theatre
The Ann Sothern Show
Brenner
The Danny Thomas Show
Dick Powell's Zane Grey TheaterDouglas Edwards with the NewsDuPont Show of the MonthThe Ed Sullivan ShowFather Knows BestThe Garry Moore ShowGeneral Electric TheaterThe George Gobel Show (moved from NBC)GunsmokeHave Gun — Will TravelThe Invisible ManI've Got a SecretThe Jack Benny ProgramLassieLeave It to BeaverThe LineupMarkhamMasquerade PartyThe MillionairePerry MasonPeck's Bad GirlPerson to PersonPlayhouse 90RawhideThe Red Skelton ShowThe Spike Jones ShowThe TexanTo Tell the TruthThe Twentieth CenturyThe United States Steel HourWestinghouse Desilu PlayhouseThe Westinghouse Lucille Ball and Desi Arnaz ShowWanted: Dead or AliveWhat's My LineNew SeriesBe Our Guest *The Betty Hutton ShowThe Big PartyBuick-Electra PlayhouseThe Dennis O'Keefe ShowDennis the MenaceThe DeputyDiagnosis: Unknown *The DuPont Show with June AllysonHenneseyHotel de PareeJohnny RingoThe Kate Smith Show *The LineupLucy in ConnecticutThe Many Loves of Dobie GillisMen into SpaceMr. LuckyThe Revlon Revue *The Robert Herridge TheatreTightrope!Not returning from 1958–59:The $64,000 QuestionArmstrong by RequestThe Arthur Godfrey ShowDecember BrideLux PlayhouseName That TuneThe Phil Silvers ShowPursuitSchlitz PlayhouseStars in ActionThat's My BoyTrackdownWestinghouse Desilu PlayhouseWestinghouse Lucille Ball-Desi Arnaz ShowYancy DerringerYour Hit ParadeNBC

Returning Series21 Beacon StreetAlcoa TheatreThe Art Carney SpecialThe Arthur Murray PartyBachelor Father (moved from CBS)Bat MastersonThe Bell Telephone HourThe Dinah Shore Chevy ShowThe Ford ShowGillette Cavalcade of SportsGoodyear Television PlayhouseThe Huntley–Brinkley ReportIt Could Be YouThe Lawless YearsThe Loretta Young ShowM SquadMasquerade PartyNBC News SpecialsOmnibusPeople Are FunnyThe Perry Como ShowPeter GunnPhillies Jackpot BowlingThe Price Is RightRichard Diamond, Private Detective (moved from CBS)StartimeThe Steve Allen Plymouth ShowTales of Wells FargoThis Is Your LifeWagon TrainYou Bet Your LifeNew SeriesBonanzaThe Chevy Mystery ShowThe DeputyFibber McGee and MollyFive FingersGas Company PlayhouseHappyJohnny StaccatoLaramieLaw of the PlainsmanLove and MarriageThe Man and the ChallengeMan from Interpol *Moment of Fear *Music on Ice *NBC Playhouse *NBC Sunday ShowcaseOverland Trail *StartimeThe Steve Allen Plymouth ShowTateThe TroubleshootersWichita TownWorld Wide '60 *Wrangler *

Not returning from 1958–59:The Adventures of Ellery QueenBehind Closed DoorsBrains & BrawnChet Huntley ReportingCimarron CityThe D.A.'s ManThe David Niven ShowThe Ed Wynn ShowFight BeatThe George Burns ShowJefferson DrumThe Music ShopNorthwest PassagePete Kelly's BluesSteve CanyonThe Thin ManNTA
Not returning from 1958–59:How to Marry a MillionaireMan Without a GunPremiere PerformanceThis is AliceNote: The * indicates that the program was introduced in midseason.

References

 McNeil, Alex. Total Television. Fourth edition. New York: Penguin Books. .
 Castleman, Harry & Podrazik, Wally (1984). The TV Schedule Book. New York: McGraw-Hill Paperbacks.
 Brooks, Tim & Marsh, Earle (2007). The Complete Directory to Prime Time Network and Cable TV Shows'' (9th ed.). New York: Ballantine. .

United States primetime network television schedules
1959 in American television
1960 in American television